Albert Toro (died 11 December 2019) was a Papua New Guinean actor, director and politician.

Toro appeared in Tukana: Husat i Asua? (1984) as the lead character, screenwriter, and director. He was also a co-creator of Warriors in Transit (1992). Toro was elected to the Bougainville House of Representatives in a 2018 by-election, succeeding Raopos Apou Tepaia, who died in 2016. Toro died on 11 December 2019.

References

Date of birth unknown
2019 deaths
Members of the Bougainville House of Representatives
Papua New Guinean actor-politicians
Male film actors
Year of birth missing